The 1985 Edgbaston Cup was a women's tennis tournament played on outdoor grass courts that was part of the Category 2 tier of the 1985 Virginia Slims World Championship Series. It was the 4th edition of the event and took place at the Edgbaston Priory Club in Birmingham, United Kingdom from 10 June until 16 June 1985. Pam Shiver won the singles title.

Entrants

Seeds

Other entrants
The following players received entry from the qualifying draw:
  Marie-Christine Calleja
  Svetlana Cherneva
  Kris Kinney
  Heather Ludloff
  Tina Mochizuki
  Jennifer Mundel
  Kim Sands
  Masako Yanagi

Finals

Singles

 Pam Shriver defeated  Betsy Nagelsen 6–1, 6–0
 It was Shriver's third title of the year and the 10th of her career.

Doubles
 Terry Holladay /  Sharon Walsh-Pete defeated  Elise Burgin /  Alycia Moulton 6–4, 5–7, 6–3
 It was Holladay's first doubles title of the year and of her career. It was Walsh-Pete's second doubles title of the year and the 22nd of her career.

References

External links
 1985 Edgbaston Cup draws
 ITF tournament edition details

Edgbaston Cup
Birmingham Classic (tennis)
Edgbaston
Edgbaston Cup